Police-General Badrodin Haiti was the Chief of the Indonesian National Police from 16 January 2015 until 13 July 2016, succeeding, Police-General Sutarman. On 16 January 2015 Badrodin was appointed by Indonesian President Joko Widodo to be the Acting Chief of Indonesian National Police replacing Sutarman, who officially retired from the service and awaiting for elected Police Chief Police-Commissioner General Budi Gunawan who was a suspect on a corruption case. On April 16, 2015, he was confirmed unanimously by Indonesian House of Representatives and sworn in by President Joko Widodo on April 17, 2015. He was replaced by Police-General Tito Karnavian.

In 2020, he was appointed as President Commissioner at state-owned construction firm Waskita Karya.

Education 
 Akpol (1982)  
 PTIK (1989) 
 Sespim (1998) 
 Lemhanas RI (2003)

Rank 
 Second Lieutenant (1982)
 First Lieutenant (1984) 
 Major (1987)
 Lieutenant Colonel (1993)
 Colonel (1997)
 Police Great Commissioner (2001)
 Police Brigadier General (2006)
 Police Inspector General (2009)
 Police Commissioner General (2013)
 Police General (2015)

Career History 
 Danton Sabhara Dit Samapta Polda Metro Jaya (1982)
 Kasubro Ops Polres Metro Depok Polda Metro Jaya (1983) 
 Kapolsek Pancoran Mas Polres Metro Depok Polda Metro Jaya (1983)
 Kabin Info PPKO Polda Metro Jaya (1984)
 Kabag Min Polres Aileu Polwil Timor Timur (1985) 
 Kasat Serse Polres Metro Bekasi Polda Metro Jaya (1990) 
 Kapolsek Metro Sawah Besar Polres Metro Jakpus Polda Metro Jaya (1993) 
 Kasat Serse Polres Metro Jakbar Polda Metro Jaya (1994)
 Wakapolres Metro Jaktim Polda Metro Jaya (1995)
 Pabungkol Spri Kapolri (1996)
 Pamen Mabes Polri (1997) 
 Paban Madya Dukminops Paban II/Ops Sops Polri (1998) 
 Chief of Probolinggo Police Resort (1999)
 Chief of Medan Metropolis Police (2000) 
 Director of East Java Criminal Investigation Police (2003) 
 Chief of Semarang Metropolis Police (2004) 
 Chief of Banten Regional Police (2004)
 Institute Secretary of Police Education and Training Institutions (2005)  
 Chief of Central Sulawesi Regional Police (2006)
 First Director of Criminal Investigation Police Agency (2008–2009)
 Chief of North Sumatra Regional Police (2009–2010)
 Head of Legal Division National Police of Indonesia(2010)
 Chief of East Java Regional Police (2010–2011)
 Expert Staff Chief of National Police of Indonesia (2011)
 Operations Assistant Chief of National Police of Indonesia (2011–2013)
 Head of the Police Security Sustainer (2013–2014)
 Vice Chief of National Police of Indonesia (2014–2015)
 Acting Chief of National Police of Indonesia (2015)
 Chief of National Police of Indonesia (2015–2016)

References 

1958 births
Living people
Indonesian police officers
People from Jember Regency